The 2008 Russian football season, saw CSKA Moscow competed in the Russian Premier League, finishing 2nd behind Rubin Kazan, and in Russian Cup. CSKA won the 2007/08 Russian Cup and progressed to the quarter-finals of the 2008-09 Cup by the end of the 2007 season.

Squad

Out on loan

Transfers

Winter

In:

 

 
 

Out:

Summer

In:

Out:

Competitions

Russian Premier League

Results by round

Results

League table

Russian Cup

2007-08

Final

2008-09
 

Quarterfinal took place during the 2009 season.

UEFA Cup

First round

Group stage

Statistics

Appearances and goals

|-
|colspan="14"|Players that left CSKA Moscow on loan during the season:

|-
|colspan="14"|Players who appeared for CSKA Moscow that left during the season:

|}

Goal Scorers

Disciplinary Record

References

2008
CSKA Moscow